Renée Beaulieu is a Canadian film director and screenwriter from Quebec, whose debut feature film Adrien (Le Garagiste) was released in 2015.

Originally from Trois-Pistoles, Quebec, Beaulieu worked as a pharmacist until deciding to leave her job and return to film school. She is now a professor of film studies at the Université de Montréal.

Her first screenplay, Le ring, was directed by Anaïs Barbeau-Lavalette in 2007. She also later wrote and directed the short films Qui, Coupable and Le Vide before making Le Garagiste, whose central theme of a man coming to terms with his mortality while suffering from kidney disease was inspired by one of her final clients as a pharmacist.

Beaulieu was also the editor of Le Garagiste. At the 4th Canadian Screen Awards in 2016, she was a nominee for Best Editing.

Filmography
Adrien (Le Garagiste) - 2015
Les Salopes, or the Naturally Wanton Pleasure of Skin - 2018

References

External links

Canadian women film directors
Canadian women screenwriters
Canadian film editors
Film directors from Quebec
Academic staff of the Université de Montréal
People from Trois-Pistoles, Quebec
Living people
Canadian women film editors
Year of birth missing (living people)